This was a new event to the ITF Women's Circuit. 

Viktoriya Tomova won the inaugural title, defeating Maria Sakkari in the final, 4–6, 6–0, 6–4.

Seeds

Main draw

Finals

Top half

Bottom half

References 
 Main draw

Naturtex Women's Open - Singles